"Before I Fall to Pieces" is a song by English rock band Razorlight, the fifth track on their self-titled second album. It was released as the third single from the album on 18 December 2006. The song peaked at number 17 on UK Singles Chart and number 20 on the Irish Singles Chart. The video for "Before I Fall to Pieces" features Scorpio (aka Nikki Diamond) from TV's Gladiators and actor Guy Pearce.

Track listings
UK 7-inch single 
 "Before I Fall to Pieces" 
 "Boys Don't Cry" 

UK CD single 
 "Before I Fall to Pieces" 
 "Teenage Kicks" 
 "In the Morning" (acoustic) 

UK DVD single 
 "Before I Fall to Pieces" (video)
 "In The Morning" (video)

Charts

Weekly charts

Year-end charts

Certifications

References

2006 singles
2006 songs
Razorlight songs
Song recordings produced by Chris Thomas (record producer)
Songs written by Andy Burrows
Songs written by Johnny Borrell
Vertigo Records singles